Kinver is a civil parish in the district of South Staffordshire, Staffordshire, England.  It contains 54 listed buildings that are recorded in the National Heritage List for England.  Of these, one is listed at Grade I, the highest of the three grades, one is at Grade II*, the middle grade, and the others are at Grade II, the lowest grade. The parish contains the village of Kinver, the smaller settlement of Stourton, and the surrounding area.  The Stourbridge Canal joins the Staffordshire and Worcestershire Canal in the parish, and listed buildings associated with these canals include locks, a toll house, a bridge, and canal workers' cottages.  Most of the other listed buildings are houses and associated structures, cottages, shop, farmhouses and farm buildings, the earliest of which are timber framed or have a timber-framed core.  The other listed buildings include a church, former schools, public houses, a former windmill, a malthouse, lodges, a milepost, a war memorial, and a telephone kiosk.


Key

Buildings

References

Citations

Sources

Kinver
South Staffordshire District